Springwell Estate is a council estate located in the eastern part of Wrekenton in Gateshead, England. 
The area is near the local shops and transport links for easy access to Gateshead and Newcastle.
The area is mainly ex-council houses of two and three bedrooms.

The estate has large parks and a nature reserve nearby, as well as being near the ground of a local football team.

Gateshead
Housing estates in England